West Falkland was a constituency of the Legislative Council of the Falkland Islands which was in existence from the first elections in the Falklands in 1949 until the 1985 election when the Falkland Islands Constitution came into force, abolishing the constituency. The constituency of West Falkland elected one member to the Legislative Council and consisted of the island of the same name and some neighbouring islands. West Falkland is now part of the Camp constituency.

Members 

Historic constituencies in the Falkland Islands